Madeleine Tabar is a Lebanese actress. She appeared in Road to Eilat (1994).

Biography
Tabar was born in Beirut on 26 February 1958. She studied Public Relations and Advertising at the Lebanese University. She began her work on radio and television in Lebanon before acting in Egypt and the Arab world.

Tabar was one of the personalities who participated in the cultural project "Egypt in the eyes of the world" at the invitation of the Embassy of Lebanon in Egypt.

Tabar has worked on television in Egypt. She speaks French.

Film 
Titles translated from Arabic

Television series 
Titles translated from Arabic

References

External links 
 The remarks of the Lebanese ambassador about the seminar Egypt in the eyes of Lebanon on 26 November 2013 (In Arabic)
 The remarks of the Lebanese ambassador about the seminar Egypt in the eyes of Lebanon (In Arabic)
 Madeleine Tabar on elcinema.com (In Arabic)

Lebanese television actresses
Living people
1958 births
Actresses from Beirut
Lebanese Christians
Lebanese University alumni
Lebanese expatriates in Egypt